Ewerton José Almeida Santos (born 23 March 1989) is a Brazilian former professional footballer who played as a centre-back.

Career
In August 2012, Ewerton signed for Anzhi Makhachkala from Corinthians having previously been on loan at Braga.

On 22 January 2015, Anzhi loaned him to Portuguese side Sporting CP for the rest of the season.

Career statistics

Honours
Sporting
Taça de Portugal: 2014–15

References

External links
Everton segue treinando no Corinthians Alagoano 
Ewerton é emprestado ao Oeste 
Zagueiro revelação se destaca pelo Corinthians Alagoano 
Sport contrata Diego Torres e Ewerton 
Zagueiro vai reforçar Braga 
Corinthians faz operação de guerra e empresta Ewerton para Braga 

1989 births
Living people
Brazilian footballers
Association football defenders
Primeira Liga players
Russian Premier League players
Sport Club Corinthians Alagoano players
Agremiação Sportiva Arapiraquense players
Oeste Futebol Clube players
Sport Club do Recife players
S.C. Braga players
FC Anzhi Makhachkala players
Sporting CP footballers
Sporting CP B players
1. FC Kaiserslautern players
1. FC Nürnberg players
Hamburger SV players
Würzburger Kickers players
2. Bundesliga players
Bundesliga players
Brazilian expatriate footballers
Brazilian expatriate sportspeople in Portugal
Expatriate footballers in Portugal
Brazilian expatriate sportspeople in Russia
Expatriate footballers in Russia
Brazilian expatriate sportspeople in Germany
Expatriate footballers in Germany